Pseudaletis rileyi is a butterfly in the family Lycaenidae. It is found in the Central African Republic and the Democratic Republic of the Congo.

References

Butterflies described in 2007
Pseudaletis